Palaemon affinis is a species of shrimp of the family Palaemonidae. Early authors used the name Palaemon affinis for specimens now known to belong to a variety of species, but P. affinis is now known to be endemic to the waters of New Zealand.

Taxonomy
Palaemon affinis was first described in 1837 by Henri Milne-Edwards as Palaemon affinis and Palaemon quoianus. In 1876, P. affinis was placed in the Leander subgenus (which is a subgenus of Palaemon). In 1954, P. affinis was moved to the Palaemon subgenus and P. quoianus was recognized as a synonym for P. affinis.

Distribution and habitat
Although previously thought to be present in many other countries, the species is now only known to occur in New Zealand. However, it has been noted that some specimens in the subantarctic islands and Australia may also be Palaemon affinis. It has been suggested that prey abundance is the main factor controlling the distribution of P. affinis.

P. affinis occurs along shores in rocky intertidal zones and in estuaries. The shrimp is very tolerant of salinity changes and can survive in water with a salinity of 5-43%

Diet 
The species is mostly carnivorous. Based on examination of stomach contents, they appear to primarily feed upon amphipods, but may also eat polychaetes, gastropods, bivalves and plant material.

References

Palaemonidae
Marine crustaceans of New Zealand
Crustaceans described in 1837
Taxa named by Henri Milne-Edwards